Bucculatrix monelpis is a moth in the  family Bucculatricidae. It was described by Edward Meyrick in 1928. It is found in Zimbabwe.

References

Natural History Museum Lepidoptera generic names catalog

Bucculatricidae
Moths described in 1928
Taxa named by Edward Meyrick
Moths of Africa